The Latvian Academy of Culture is a higher education establishment in Latvia offering various bachelor's, magister and doctoral degree programmes on cultural subjects. The academy was founded in 1990 and is located in the Latgale Suburb of Riga.

History 
On 29 December 1990, the Latvian Cabinet of Ministers adopted the decision to create what would later be known as the Academy of Culture. The philosopher Pēteris Laķis was appointed rector and, in cooperation with the head of the Jāzeps Vītols Latvian Academy of Music, Jānis Siliņš, tasked with founding the new academy and form its study programmes. Studies began in the summer of 1991 with 25 students studying Cultural Theory, History and Administration, and five students studying Latvian and Danish, Latvian and Swedish, Latvian and Norwegian, Latvian and Polish, and Latvian and Lithuanian. The first bachelor's degree students were enrolled in 1995, and in 1997 the first magister degree students were matriculated. In 2003, the first doctoral thesis was defended at the academy.

Rectors 
 Pēteris Laķis – philosopher (1991–2003)
 Jānis Siliņš – theatre scientist (1990–2014)
  – culture anthropologist (2014–present)

Notable alumni 

 Inga Alsiņa – actress
 Baiba Broka – actress
 Rasa Bugavičute-Pēce – playwright and author
 Lolita Čigāne – politician, former MP
 Agris Daņiļevičs – choreographer
 Inga Gaile – playwright and poet

 Iveta Grigule-Pēterse – politician, former MEP
 Jānis Joņevs – author
 Dace Melbārde – politician, current MEP
 Kristīne Nevarauska – actress
 Kārlis Vērdiņš – poet
 Kaspars Znotiņš – actor

References

External links 
 Official website (in English)

Latvian Academy of Culture
Universities and colleges in Latvia
Education in Riga